Siruiyeh (also Romanized as Sīrū’īyeh and Sīrūyeh) is a village in Chahar Gonbad Rural District, in the Central District of Sirjan County, Kerman Province, Iran. At the 2006 census, its population was 70, in 20 families.

References 

Populated places in Sirjan County